Appoigny is a commune in the Yonne department in Bourgogne-Franche-Comté in north-central France.

This village with all its flowers is well known for its architectural heritage but also for its hotels and restaurants. The Saint Pierre Collegial - a classified Historic Building - dates back to the 13th century. It has a tower of the 16th century and a magnificent Jube dating from 1606.

See also
Communes of the Yonne department

References

Communes of Yonne